Hegde means the Headman of the village. Hegde or Heggade Pergade  is a surname found mainly in the  coastal Karnataka region in India which is found in different communities.   It is found amongst Hindus of the Kuruba Gowda community, Bunt community, Saraswat brahmins, Jain community, Havyaka Brahmins, Vokkaligas in Karnataka.

The name derives from the Old Kannada word Pergade which means chief.

Etymology
The word Hegde is derived from the Old Kannada word Pergade which means chief.

Notable people

The following is a list of notable people with last name Hegde.

Film Industry
 Ganesh Hegde, choreographer
 Latha Hegde, Indian actress
 Pakhi Hegde, Indian actress
 Pooja Hegde, Indian model and actress
 Samyuktha Hegde, Indian actress
 Sanjith Hegde, Indian singer and songwriter
 Satya Hegde, cinematographer
 Senna Hegde, Indian director
 Manjunath Hegde Kelase, cinematographer

Politicians
 Ananth Kumar Hegde, Indian politician and MP
 K. S. Hegde, former Speaker of the Lok Sabha
 Ramakrishna Hegde, Indian politician
 Vishweshwar Hegde Kageri, Indian politician, Speaker of Karnataka Legislative Assembly and MLA
 Pramod Hegde Yellapur, Indian politician

Officials
 N. Santosh Hegde, former justice of the Supreme Court Of India
 Jagannathrao Hegde, former Sheriff of Mumbai
 Sanjay Hegde, senior advocate at the Supreme Court of India

Spiritual
 Veerendra Heggade, The Dharmadhikari of Dharmasthala Temple

Authors
 Belle Monappa Hegde, Indian medical scientist, educationist and author

Entrepreneurs
 V. G. Siddhartha Hegde (1959–2019), entrepreneur

Villages
 Hegde (village)

Others
 R. K. Hegde (1931–1991), Indian plant pathologist
Keremane Shivarama Hegde, Renowned Yakshagana Artist 
 Panduranga Hegde, environmentalist
Keremane Shambhu Hegde, World renowned Yakshagana Artist and Indian Choreographer
 Sukesh Hegde, Kabaddi player
 Jyoti Hegde, musician

References

Indian surnames
Karnataka society
Bunt community surnames